Donald Ray "Don" Jones (born March 26, 1969), is a former NFL linebacker for the New York Jets and Minnesota Vikings.  He played college football at the University of Washington and was drafted in the ninth round of the 1992 NFL Draft.

See also
 Washington Huskies football statistical leaders

External links
 
 Profile at Pro Football Reference
 NFL.com player page

1969 births
Living people
American football linebackers
Washington Huskies football players
New York Jets players
Minnesota Vikings players
Sportspeople from Lynchburg, Virginia
Players of American football from Virginia